Alan McKee is an Australian university professor and researcher of sexualised media.

He has served as the president of the Cultural Studies Association of Australasia and sits on the editorial boards of the academic journals Continuum, M/C Journal, and the magazine Girlfriend Guide to Life.

Education 
He originally studied film and television, graduating with a PhD from the University of Glasgow in 1996.

Career 
After emigrating to Australia McKee worked at Edith Cowan University and the University of Queensland before moving to the Queensland University of Technology, where he is currently a professor in the Creative Industries Faculty. He has published six academic books and over sixty refereed journal articles and book chapters. These have covered topics such as children and media, indigenous Australians and media, television in Australia, reality tv, soap opera, violence and media, youth and media, Americanisation, and gay and queer representation in the media.

He is best known for his research on pornography. He was the Chief Investigator of 'Understanding pornography in Australia', the first comprehensive examination of the production and consumption of pornography in Australia. This project presented a wide-ranging view of the adult-content industry and its consumers. This research proved controversial for taking an evidence-led approach to understanding sexually explicit media. For example, the project surveyed over 1,000 consumers of pornography and discovered that, for the vast majority, the effects of exposure to sexually explicit material were felt to be positive.

He has also worked in media production, including the television series Big Brother Australia, where he served as media expert in the first season; and script writing for the Australian television series The Sideshow, featuring Paul McDermott (comedian).

Bibliography
Books
 
 
 
 
 
 

Journal articles
 
An extended review of: 
 
 
 
 
  Pdf.

References

Academic staff of Queensland University of Technology
Semioticians
Australian non-fiction writers
Living people
Year of birth missing (living people)